USNS Arrowhead (T-AGSE-4) is a submarine support vessel acquired by the U.S. Navy in 2015 and assigned to Military Sealift Command.

Construction
Arrowhead was built in 2009 by Leevec Industries, Jennings, Louisiana, for Hornbeck Offshore.

See also
 List of Military Sealift Command ships

References

External links

 USNS Arrowhead (T-AGSE-4)

Auxiliary ships of the United States Navy
2009 ships
Black Powder-class submarine and special warfare support vessels